Cigarettes and Valentines is an unreleased studio album by American rock band Green Day. The album would have been the follow-up to Warning (2000). In 2003, the album was nearly finished when the master tapes were mysteriously stolen from the band's studio. Instead of re-recording the album, the band decided to start from scratch, leading to the creation of American Idiot (2004).

In an interview with NME on November 18, 2016, Armstrong and Dirnt stated that the master tapes are being used for new songs.

History
Lead singer Billie Joe Armstrong said the album's material was "good stuff". Musically, the material on Cigarettes and Valentines was hard, "quick-tempoed punk" songs in the vein of Green Day's Kerplunk and Insomniac. This sound would have contrasted the group's previous two studio albums, Nimrod and Warning, which displayed more rock and folk punk genres respectively. Bassist Mike Dirnt described the band's decision of returning to the sound found on their older albums, stating, "We've had a nice break from making hard and fast music and it's made us want to do it again." However, despite the album being nearly complete, in 2003 the album's master tapes were stolen from the studio. However, Green Day would later call the theft a "blessing in disguise", believing the album was not "maximum Green Day". Dirnt admitted that backups of the tapes were made but claims that "it just wasn't the same as the originals". Ultimately the band decided against re-recording the album and instead started from scratch, which eventually led to the creation of their 2004 album American Idiot. Some songs were later re-recorded or reworked into new songs, but despite the band eventually recovering the stolen tapes, the original versions of the songs have never been officially released. 

The Network's album Money Money 2020, released on September 30, 2003, through Billie Joe Armstrong's Adeline Records, was speculated by some fans as being a re-recording of the album, or to contain aspects of it. Armstrong has denied any connection between the two projects in various interviews.

Live performances and other appearances
The title song, "Cigarettes and Valentines", was first played live in Greenwood Village, Colorado, on August 28, 2010, during the band's concert at the Comfort Dental Amphitheatre while on their 21st Century Breakdown World Tour. This show was being filmed to eventually contribute to a forthcoming live album, leading to speculation that some of the songs from the Cigarettes and Valentines sessions would eventually be released. 

A live recording of "Cigarettes and Valentines" saw an official release on the Awesome as Fuck live album. On February 14, 2011, the official lyric video for the song was released on Green Day's official YouTube channel. Four days later, the official video for the song was released there as well. A live promo single was released on February 21, 2011, containing 2:43 of the performance in Phoenix, Arizona (the shots of the crowd are from the concert in Buenos Aires, Argentina).

References
 

Green Day albums
Unreleased albums